Donald Hall (1867–1948) was a British-American film actor of the silent era. He was married to the actress Frankie Mann and was brother-in-law to Alice Mann. He appeared in a number of Vitagraph Studios films during the 1910s. He also appeared in films produced by Triangle, Goldwyn, Selznick and Paramount Pictures. Following the introduction of sound he made only a few uncredited appearances.

Selected filmography

 Mr. Barnes of New York (1914)
 The Christian (1914)
 Anselo Lee (1915)
 Mortmain (1915)
 Playing Dead (1915)
 Mrs. Dane's Danger (1916)
 The Law Decides (1916)
 Salvation Joan (1916)
 The Sex Lure (1916)
 Hesper of the Mountains (1916)
 The Scarlet Runner (1916)
 The On-the-Square Girl (1917)
 The Awakening of Ruth (1917)
 The Moth (1917)
The Raggedy Queen (1917)
 Alias Mrs. Jessop (1917)
 The Face in the Dark (1918)
 The Great Adventure (1918)
 The Carter Case (1919)
 The Water Lily (1919)
 Love and the Woman (1919)
 The Chosen Path (1919)
 The Broken Melody (1919)
 Fruits of Passion (1919)
 The Great Shadow (1920)
 A Woman's Business (1920)
 The Greatest Love (1920)
 In the Shadow of the Dome (1920)
 A Woman's Woman (1922)
 The Last Moment (1923)
 Unguarded Women (1924)
 Her Love Story (1924)
 The Spirit of Youth (1929)
 Oh, For a Man! (1930)
 Clive of India (1935)
 San Francisco (1936)
 Stop, Look and Love (1939)
 Government Girl (1943)

References

Bibliography
 Goble, Alan. The Complete Index to Literary Sources in Film. Walter de Gruyter, 1999.

External links

1867 births
1948 deaths
American male film actors
British male film actors
British emigrants to the United States
British people in colonial India